The 1987 World Junior Figure Skating Championships were held on December 2–7, 1986 in Kitchener, Ontario, Canada. The event was sanctioned by the International Skating Union and open to ISU member nations. Medals were awarded in the disciplines of men's singles, ladies' singles, pair skating, and ice dancing.

Results

Men

Ladies

Pairs

Ice dancing

References

World Junior Figure Skating Championships
1986 in figure skating
1987 in figure skating
World Junior 1987